The 2000 United States Senate election in Utah took place on November 7, 2000. Incumbent Republican U.S. Senator Orrin Hatch won re-election to a fifth term.

Major candidates

Democratic 
 Scott N. Howell, State Senator

Republican 
 Orrin Hatch, incumbent U.S. Senator

Campaign

Debates
Complete video of debate, October 20, 2000

Results

See also 
 2000 United States Senate elections

References 

Utah
2000
2000 Utah elections